Aleuritideae is a tribe of the subfamily Crotonoideae, under the family Euphorbiaceae. It comprises 6 subtribes and 14 genera.

Genera

See also
 Taxonomy of the Euphorbiaceae

References

External links
 
 

 
Euphorbiaceae tribes